The National Service Act 1948 was an Act of Parliament which extended the British conscription of the Second World War long after the war-time need for it had expired, in the form of "National Service". After a bill with the same purpose had been approved in 1947, expected to be implemented 1 January 1949, the Cold War and the Malayan Emergency caused a revised and extended version of the new legislation to be approved in December 1948, only days before the new arrangements came into force.

The act had much in common with the National Service Act of September 1939, which it superseded, but its aim was to continue National Service even at times when the country was not at war. The National Service Act of September 1939 had not addressed this issue.

The National Service Act 1948 applied to all healthy young men (women did not have to do National Service) who were not registered as conscientious objectors. It did not affect the exemption from service of registered conscientious objectors, nor the procedure for registration.

Background
In 1948, the British post-war government realised the need for an armed forces larger than that which voluntary recruitment could provide. Discussions were soon started in parliament on a new National Service Act with a first such act being approved in July 1947. This first version was to come into force on 1 January 1949 and established the period of National Service to 12 months. However, financial crises, the advent of the Cold War and the Malayan Emergency caused the act to be amended before coming into force. The amendment was approved in December 1948, with the date in which it would come into force still being 1 January 1949.

Differences from the previous act
The act changed the age range from 18–41 to 17–21, and increased the period of service required from 6 to 18 months. As with previous acts, men who completed the service remained on the reserve list for the number of years in the age-range (four years) which started being counted from the moment they finished serving. However, men on the reserve list could only be called for periods of up to 20 days (previous acts allowed the period to be indefinite), and could not be called more than three times.

The act also changed the trades considered essential services to the merchant navy, farming and coal mining (previously, essential services were coal mining, shipbuilding, engineering-related trades and—to a limited extent—medicine). Young men working in the essential services were exempted from National Service for a period of eight years. If they stopped working in these industries before this period of eight years ended (that is, before turning 25), they could be called up for National Service. Because of the political issues which would have arisen, there was also no recruitment of national servicemen from Northern Ireland.

Korean War modifications of the act
In October 1950, in response to the British involvement in the Korean War, the service period was extended to two years, although this was waived for those who had been admitted to but would otherwise be unable to commence university courses in autumn 1950. Thereby, only a very few actually undertook 18 months of national service.

To compensate for those whose service was extended to two years, the reserve period was reduced by six months.

Ending in 1963

National Service ended gradually from 1957. It was decided that those born on or after 1 October 1939 would not be required, but conscription continued for those born earlier whose call-up had been delayed for any reason. In November 1960 the last men entered service, as call-ups formally ended on 31 December 1960, and the last National Servicemen left the armed forces in May 1963.

Support for reintroduction
In 2015, Prince Harry made a call for bringing back the National Service. Following the launch of his 2009 film Harry Brown,  English actor Michael Caine called for the reintroduction of national service in the UK to give young people "a sense of belonging rather than a sense of violence".

References

Conscription in the United Kingdom
20th-century military history of the United Kingdom
United Kingdom Acts of Parliament 1948
1948 in military history
United Kingdom military law
British defence policymaking
Conscription law